The lebes gamikos, or "nuptial lebes," (plural lebetes gamikoi) is a form of ancient Greek pottery used in marriage ceremonies (literally, it means marriage vase). It was probably used in the ritual sprinkling of the bride with water before the wedding. In form, it has a large bowl-like body and a stand that can be long or short. Painted scenes are placed on either the body of the vessel or the stand.

One of the earliest lebetes gamikoi was apparently painted by a follower of Sophilos (c. 580–570). It was decorated with the wedding procession of Helen and Menelaus.

A typical lebes gamikos shows wedding scenes (including mythic weddings such as the wedding of Peleus and Thetis, but the iconography can also  be related to scenes such as mimes.

Notes

Wedding objects
Ancient Greek pot shapes
Marriage, unions and partnerships in Greece